Love for Sale is an album by Irish singer Mary Coughlan that was released in July 1995 by Demon Records.

Track listing 
"A Thrill's a Thrill" (Long John Baldry)
"Moon Over Bourbon Street" (Sting)
"Baby Plays Around" (Elvis Costello, Cait O'Riordan)
"You Go to My Head" (J. Fred Coots, Haven Gillespie)
"Love for Sale" (Cole Porter)
"A Fine Romance" (Dorothy Fields, Jerome Kern)
"Damn Your Eyes" (Steve Bogard, Barbara Wyrick)
"To Love a Man" (Mary Coughlan, Antoinette Hensey)
"Drinking the Diamonds" (D. Long)
"Upon a Veil of Midnight Blue" (Elvis Costello)
"These Boots Are Made for Walkin'" (Lee Hazlewood)
"You Send Me" (Sam Cooke)

Personnel 
 Mary Coughlan – vocals
 Richie Buckley – saxophone
 James Delaney – keyboard
 Dick Farrelly – guitar
 Paul Moore – double bass
 Robbie Casserly – drums
 Erik Visser – producer

References

1995 live albums
Demon Music Group albums
Mary Coughlan (singer) albums